The Common Lisp Interface Manager (CLIM) is a Common Lisp-based programming interface for creating user interfaces, i.e., graphical user interfaces (GUIs). It provides an application programming interface (API) to user interface facilities for the programming language Lisp. It is a fully object-oriented programming user interface management system, using the Common Lisp Object System (CLOS) and is based on the mechanism of stream input and output. There are also facilities for output device independence. It is descended from the GUI system Dynamic Windows of Symbolics' Lisp machines between 1988 and 1993.

The main development was CLIM 2.0, released in 1993. It is free and open source software released under a GNU Library General Public License (LGPL).

CLIM has been designed to be portable across different Common Lisp implementations and different windowing systems. It uses a reflective architecture for its window system interface. CLIM supports, like Dynamic Windows, so-called Presentations.

CLIM is available for Allegro CL, LispWorks, Macintosh Common Lisp, and Symbolics Genera

A free software implementation of CLIM is named McCLIM. It has several extensions to CLIM and has been used for several applications like Climacs, an Emacs-like editor. It also provides a mouse-sensitive Lisp Listener, a read–eval–print loop (REPL) for Common Lisp.

Applications using CLIM
 BB1 Blackboard Kernel (BBK)
 CLASP: analyzes data from experiments via graphics, statistical tests, and various data manipulation types
 CLIB, a prototype interface builder for CLIM
 Direct Labor Management System (DLMS), manages automobile manufacturing process system at Ford assembly plants
 DLMAPS, an ontology-based spatial query language and environment, a predecessor of GeoSPARQL
 GenEd, editor with generic semantics for formal reasoning on visual notations
 Grasper-CL, graph management system
 KONWERK, a domain independent configuration tool
 Mirage, an editor for building gadget-oriented graphical user interfaces.
Pathway Tools, a comprehensive bioinformatics software package that spans genome data management, systems biology, and omics data analysis.
 Petri nets, a Petri net editor and simulator 
 SENEX, a CLOS/CLIM application for molecular pathology
 SPIKE, scheduling system for the Hubble space telescope observations. Also used for ASTRO-D, an X-Ray observation astronomy mission
 SpyGlass, an analysis environment for viewing packet traces, from BBN.
 VITRA Workbench, an integrated vision and natural language processing system
 VISCO, a visual spatial query language
 Climaxima, a Maxima (software) graphical front-end.
 Tangram, a Tangram Puzzle Solver capable of solving arbitrary geometric tiling problems.

References

External links
 , McCLIM
 CLIM 2.0 Specification as multiple HTML pages; (McCLIM tarballs contain the specification's TeX sources)

Common Lisp
Common Lisp (programming language) software